Kaitlynne D. Postel (born September 7, 1986) is an American pageant competitor and vocalist from Lexington, Kentucky who competed in the Miss America pageant in 2008.

Pageant history
Kaitlynne won the Miss Kentucky 2007 title in a state pageant held in Lexington at the Singletary Center for the Arts on the University of Kentucky campus on July 21, 2007. She competed as Miss Monticello, a local title she won in November 2006. She had also competed in the Miss Lexington Pageant, her first pageant, where she received 3rd runner-up. Kaitlynne's mother Lynne Postel held many Kentucky local titles, and was 1st runner up. In 1982, Lynne was crowned Miss Maryland. Kaitlynne's aunt, Maricia Malone Bell was Miss Kentucky 1978. Her cousin is famed actress, Laura Bell Bundy.

In December 2008, Kaitlynne competed in the Miss Kentucky USA pageant, where she placed 2nd runner up.

Miss America
She competed in the Miss America 2008 contest in Las Vegas in 2008.  She performed "So Much Better" from Legally Blonde: The Musical, in which her cousin and close friend Laura Bell Bundy was the star.

References

External links
 
 Miss Kentucky Official website

1986 births
Living people
American beauty pageant winners
Beauty pageants in Kentucky
Miss America 2008 delegates
Miss Kentucky winners
People from Lexington, Kentucky
University of Kentucky alumni